Gerald Curran (March 20, 1939 – March 27, 2013) was an American politician and lawyer.

Born in Baltimore, Maryland, Curran received his bachelor's and law degrees from the University of Baltimore. He practiced law and was in the insurance business. He served in the Maryland House of Delegates as a Democrat from 1967 to 1998. He was married to Anna Jeannette Curran and has five children. His first cousin was J. Joseph Curran Jr. He died in Baltimore, Maryland.

Notes

1939 births
2013 deaths
Politicians from Baltimore
University of Baltimore alumni
University of Baltimore School of Law alumni
Maryland lawyers
Businesspeople from Baltimore
Democratic Party members of the Maryland House of Delegates
Lawyers from Baltimore
20th-century American businesspeople
20th-century American lawyers